Geli Ali Beg Waterfall is located in the Kurdistan Region of Iraq, which lies some 130 km north of Erbil.

The waterfall is named after Prince Ali Beg of the Soran Emirate.

It featured on the 5-dinar note issued 1978–1990.

References 

Waterfalls of Iraq
Geography of Iraqi Kurdistan
Tourist attractions in Iraqi Kurdistan